Newmarket is an Auckland suburb to the south-east of the central business district. With its high building density, especially of retail shops, it is considered New Zealand's premier retailing area, and a rival of local competitor Auckland CBD.

While as early as 1873, Newmarket has been referred to as a 'suburb' of Auckland, in fact until the amalgamation of the borough councils into Auckland City Council in 1989, local governance was by the Newmarket Borough Council, with its own Mayor. The borough, while one of the smallest in the Auckland Region, was also one of the busiest. This is especially true of Broadway, the main street, which has large shopping centres and smaller retail tenancies (with a total of over 400 stores as of mid-2010), two movie theatres, and numerous restaurants, bars and cafés.

History

Māori beginnings

Tāmaki Māori called this area, particularly the south of the current Newmarket, Te Tī Tūtahi, 'the cabbage tree standing alone' or 'the cabbage tree of singular importance', referring to a tree which stood on the corner of Mortimer Pass and Broadway (according to other references at the corner of Clovernook Road and Broadway) until 1908. Some of the cabbage trees in the area are descended from this tree, after Alfred Buckland rescued a portion and replanted trees around Newmarket and as far away as Bucklands Beach.

In the general area of Nuffield Street / Mahuru Street, no remnants today are visible of the Mahuru Spring, once sacred to the local Māori iwi. It is noted that the spring was named after the Māori word for the season of spring.

European settlement

The earliest subdivision of land in this location took place in June 1841. In 1842 Epsom Road was formed, running from the bottom of town up through Parnell towards the middle of the Auckland isthmus. This was later called Manukau Road before being given its current name, Parnell Road. The position of Newmarket at the start of several major roads to the east and south, including Great South Road, was to strongly influence its character as a transport hub and "Gateway to the South".

In 1845 Khyber Pass Road was formed and the intersection of these three roads was called "Hobson's Bridge"  referring to a  small wooden bridge that crossed over "Hobson's creek" (more or less where the railway track passes near the Olympic Swimming Pool). A very small bridge was the most noteworthy landmark of the area, giving some idea of the rather empty nature of the landscape.

Around 1851 this area received the name Newmarket because it was the site of the 'New Market' for livestock. Farmers would drive their stock up the Manukau, Great South, or Remuera Roads to the market which was better situated than the earlier stock market in Auckland proper. The presence of the Newmarket railway station connecting it with Auckland, opened in 1873 after the completion of the first Parnell Tunnel, was also a great advantage. The market was located to the south of Remuera Road and east of Manukau Road.

Overlooking Newmarket on a bluff to the south east is a 19th-century wooden house in the Gothic style called Highwic. The home of a local businessman Alfred Buckland, Highwic is now owned by the Auckland Council and administered by Heritage New Zealand. Another piece of Auckland land owned by Alfred Buckland located further out of town is still called "Bucklands Beach".

Thriving suburb

The main road of Newmarket is called Broadway. Originally Manukau Road, it was renamed Broadway in late 1912 by the Newmarket Borough Council to reflect the fact that it was no longer a muddy, dusty slushy street. The Broadway Cinema opened in 1911 as the Adelphi Theatre and changed its name in early 1915. The picture hall was a brick and corrugated iron shed linked by a passage to a retail block on Broadway. The cinema lasted until late 1925. Like its New York namesake, Newmarket's Broadway developed a rather bright 'Moderne' flashy image in the 1930s & 1940s and by the 1960s had the biggest collection of neon signs in the country.

The Olympic Swimming Pool was constructed in 1939 to the designs of the borough engineer N. F. Alcock. This Art deco building was opened by the Minister of Internal Affairs, the Hon William Parry in 1940. As well as being the borough's only public amenity the Olympic sized swimming pool was a great asset for the whole of Auckland. Over the years it has been well used and facilitated the hosting of many sporting events by Auckland including the Empire Games in 1950. Recently the pool's streamline art deco form was considerably changed when a cinema complex was built over the pool, which was previously open to the sky. To the north of the Olympic Swimming Pools is the Olympic Park War Memorial.

Located to the south of the Olympic Pools is Lumsden Green. The Green occupies a triangle of land at the intersection of Parnell Road, Broadway and Khyber Pass which had been put aside as a reserve in 1878. The park is ornamented by a modernist fountain, a 19th-century cannon and a stainless steel sculpture by Marte Szirmay installed in 1969 to mark the centenary of the Newmarket Highway district. The park is named in honour of David Lumsden, the last Mayor of Newmarket before amalgamation with Auckland City in 1989.

For much of the 20th century, most road traffic leaving or entering Auckland passed through Newmarket. Leading off Broadway is the beginning of Remuera Road which is the way to the eastern suburbs while further south Broadway splits into Great South Road and the secondary southern route, Manukau Road. The constant flow of traffic only added to Newmarket's fast, modern image and helped a great deal with its prosperity. Around 1966, between 25,000-30,000 cars used the street per day.

A significant change to the skyline was the Newmarket Viaduct erected in 1966 to take one of the early sections of the Southern Motorway over the railway and half a dozen streets. The new motorway system opened up the new industrial suburbs to the south such as Penrose, Mount Wellington etc. This resulted in much  of the local industry moving out of Newmarket and along with it many of the working-class people who lived in modest houses in the surrounding streets.

Since the 1960s Newmarket has been largely a retail destination, although a certain amount of light industry still existed in the surrounding streets, the most significant of which is the brewing trade. Ever since the 1840s Newmarket has been the location of several breweries. Water falling on nearby Mount Eden emerges in several reliable springs in the Khyber Pass area. Flowing through large amounts of volcanic scoria it is very well filtered. The brewery buildings on Khyber Pass Road have recently (2014) been demolished, the land has been redeveloped as part of the University of Auckland.

Modern days

Newmarket has become one of New Zealand's most significant retail and hospitality destinations, and also a major entertainment hub. At the same time, the location on one of the major thoroughfares into and out of the city also led to increasing bottleneck issues, with some claiming during the middle of the 2000s that Council was neglecting the area (though projects like the Central Connector have helped to alleviate this). Traffic gridlock was one of the reasons why a plan for a major new Westfield Group shopping centre near the railway line was hotly contested by the Newmarket Protection Society, a group composed mostly of residents and some local business owners. Partly due to these objections, Westfield abandoned the plans and instead bought the Two Double Seven shopping centre, which underwent major redevelopment and expansion during 2017-2020.

Traffic remains a major factor in the area, as Broadway carries over 40,000 vehicles a day, limiting the ability of pedestrians in the shopping district to cross the main road. An ambitious earlier plan from 2003 to construct a "road over rail" above the railway line, from the northwest end of Newmarket near Park Road, to the southeast near the St Marks Road interchange, did not go ahead, even though this could have significantly reduced vehicle traffic on Broadway. A late 2000s upgrade has however provided new high-quality bluestone footpaths along Broadway and some of the side-streets.

The Auckland Regional Council has designated Newmarket as a 'strategic managed growth area' in the Regional Growth Strategy, meaning that high-density mixed use (residential and commercial) buildings are encouraged. This is to encourage areas in which work, living and entertainment can be achieved close to each other, limiting the average amount of [especially car-] traffic required every day. Good public transport connections are also considered to assist these policy goals. Partly due to the increasing attractiveness of living in the city, large apartment buildings are now increasingly springing up in the area, a process partly encouraged by Council via new planning rules. However, many of the apartment buildings that were created in the suburb in the 2000s have been heavily criticised, and termed clusters of "shoe boxes" or "rabbit hutches", for their small unit sizes and bland exterior.

In 2007, the Lion Brewery declared its intention to leave Newmarket in the mid-term and sold its 5ha site north of Khyber Pass Road for NZ$162 million. The area is likely to become a mixed-use development within the next half decade, marking "the end of Newmarket's industrial age", especially after Hayes Metal Refineries Ltd, the other previously remaining industry, had also decided to move in 2008, after the owners had resisted development offers to be bought out in the 1980s.

In 2012 an initiative between Newmarket Business Association and the arts resulted in the creation of the town's first fully professional theatre company, Newmarket Stage Company. The brainchild of Adey Ramsel, the company's first Artistic Director, the company aimed to build on the infrastructure of transport, cafe's, restaurants and bars. Operating out of The Factory Theatre in Eden St, the company launched with Educating Rita by Willy Russell and Tuesdays With Morrie by Mitch Albom and Jeffrey Hatcher. Kiwi actor George Henare became the company's inaugural patron in 2014. Henare played the lead in the company's first two productions.

Newmarket shopping area's wireless CCTV system, a system cooperatively operated by the police and the Newmarket Business Association, has been described as "never having been done on this scale in a New Zealand town centre", and was credited partly for significant falls of some sorts of crime in Newmarket in recent (2009) years.

Demographics

Newmarket had a population of 3,993 at the 2018 New Zealand census, an increase of 309 people (8.4%) since the 2013 census, and an increase of 1,731 people (76.5%) since the 2006 census. There were 1,608 households, comprising 1,854 males and 2,136 females, giving a sex ratio of 0.87 males per female. The median age was 35.2 years (compared with 37.4 years nationally), with 402 people (10.1%) aged under 15 years, 1,131 (28.3%) aged 15 to 29, 1,803 (45.2%) aged 30 to 64, and 657 (16.5%) aged 65 or older.

Ethnicities were 49.0% European/Pākehā, 2.9% Māori, 1.5% Pacific peoples, 48.5% Asian, and 3.5% other ethnicities. People may identify with more than one ethnicity.

The percentage of people born overseas was 57.0, compared with 27.1% nationally.

Although some people chose not to answer the census's question about religious affiliation, 51.8% had no religion, 34.0% were Christian, 0.1% had Māori religious beliefs, 2.6% were Hindu, 1.4% were Muslim, 2.9% were Buddhist and 1.7% had other religions.

Of those at least 15 years old, 1,725 (48.0%) people had a bachelor's or higher degree, and 216 (6.0%) people had no formal qualifications. The median income was $41,700, compared with $31,800 nationally. 936 people (26.1%) earned over $70,000 compared to 17.2% nationally. The employment status of those at least 15 was that 1,788 (49.8%) people were employed full-time, 471 (13.1%) were part-time, and 138 (3.8%) were unemployed.

Governance
Newmarket had a local government just like other suburbs of Auckland at that time. The Borough of Newmarket was constituted on 7 May 1885. Before this date the affairs of the district were administered by the Newmarket Highway District (established 26 December 1868) and the Newmarket Road Board (established 19 March 1883).  Newmarket Borough Council was merged into Auckland City Council in 1989, then eventually merged into Auckland Council in 2010. During the time when Newmarket was governing itself, it had its own mayor.

Mayors (1885–1989)
William John Suiter, 1885–1887
William Morgan, 1887–1891
George Kent, 1891–1893
Federick George Clayton, 1893–1895
John McIntyre Laxon, 1895–1899
John McColl, 1899–1904
Francis Bennett, 1904–1909
Ernest Hyam Davis, 1909–1911
David Teed, 1911–1915
James McColl, 1915–1917
Christopher Leek, 1917–1921
Samuel Donaldson, 1921–1944
Richard Edward Newport, 1944–1944
Charles Hugh Kay Mountain, 1944–1947
Frederick Phillpott, 1947–1953
George Albert Hardley, 1953–1957
William "Bill" White, 1957–1974
David Hadley Lumsden, 1974–1989

Newmarket Business Association (1937-present)

Newmarket's governance has always been driven by the business community. In the early days it was farmers, brewers, hoteliers, retailers and trades associated with the slaughterhouse that lent their voice. Some of whom became Wardens of the Hundred of Auckland or members of the Newmarket Highway Board or Roads Board or, from 1885, the Newmarket Borough Council. Since the dis-establishment of the Borough Council, the Newmarket Business Association (NBA), which was first incorporated in 1937, has filled that void. The NBA is the face and voice of the local business community's interests. Many of the issues affecting business owners today, were the same 100 years ago: traffic, roads, footpaths, safety and general infrastructure.

In the early 1990s the NBA became part of Auckland Council's Mainstreet funding programme and appointed its first official town centre manager, Sue Gunn, in 1994. Then followed Robin Winter, Cameron Brewer (2005-2010), Ashley Church (2010-2014) and the incumbent Mark Knoff-Thomas (2014-present). 

Auckland Council eventually introduced the Business Improvement District (BID) Programme which the NBA became part of - with the support of the business community. Newmarket's defined BID area has a targeted rate applied to the commercial property values. The council collects this levy on behalf of the business association, and then pays out a quarterly grant to fund the associations operations.

These days the NBA has a team of 9 who focus on advocacy, marketing, arts & heritage, membership services and security for the Newmarket precinct. The NBA manages the Newmarket website, social media pages (@newmarketnz), and produces NEWMARKET. magazine.

Education

The Senior Campus of ACG Parnell College is in Newmarket.

Railway history

Newmarket was once a centre of railway activity, with significant growth occurring after the rail line from the city was opened in 1873. Eventually, there was a junction station, two signal boxes, two railway workshop complexes, railway houses, a railway social hall and extensive goods yard. This changed in 1930 when the Newmarket Workshops closed and its functions were taken over by the Otahuhu Workshops. The workshops bordering Broadway on the other side of the Remuera Road overbridge were torn down. The workshops along Middleton Road were retained and transferred to the New Zealand Post Office for use as Post Office workshops and these structures remained in place until they were unceremoniously torn down in the mid-1990s.

On 22 February 1955 the Railway Lodge No 196 of the Royal Antediluvian Order of Buffaloes was established in the Newmarket Railway Social Hall with a strong presence of over 100 brothers of the order, many of whom had connection with the railways. The Lodge continued to thrive for many years because of its link with the railways. The Railway Lodge 196 is a lodge of the New Zealand constitution of the Grand Lodge of England and continues to function, albeit in Ponsonby, not Newmarket.

In the 1980s the Newmarket Railway Social Hall and many other railway buildings were demolished. By 1995 all that was left of Newmarket's railway heritage was the Fine Station, closed in 1983 and its signal box still staffed, and one of the last in New Zealand to utilise the old style lever frame. The old workshop buildings on Middleton Road were demolished in that year. By the 21st century little remained of Newmarket's railway heritage other than the station, the signal box, a few items of preserved rolling stock and the Railway Lodge No 196.

Construction proceeded in 2008 on a new railway station and plaza on the northern side of Remuera Road overbridge, as a part of the Auckland Regional Transport Authority's upgrade of rail stations across the city. Designed by Opus International Consultants, the station features two concourses, multiple escalators, and open access to Broadway via a wide plaza. A footbridge allows access to the station for pedestrians from Remuera Road. The station opened on 14 January 2010 and is the second busiest in Auckland after Britomart.

Notable buildings

Owing to redevelopment, Newmarket has lost many of its buildings of historical significance.

Highwic circa 1863, Gillies Avenue, old homestead of Alfred Buckland; extant & open to the public - has been called one of Auckland's most notable historic houses, built in the Carpenter Gothic style from an American pattern book.
Junction Hotel 1850s Cnr of Broadway, Great South & Manukau Roads demolished.
Newmarket Hotel 1850s, rebuilt 1920s Cnr Broadway & Morrow St demolished.
St Georges Hotel 1880s Broadway opposite Khyber Pass demolished.
Carlton Club 1890s corner of Broadway & Khyber Pass Road extant.
Former Newmarket Manual Training School 1903, Seccombes Rd, moved to this site from Mortimer Pass Road in 1925.
Captain Cook Brewery, 1870s - 1920s Khyber Pass road, demolished.
Newmarket Borough Council Chambers 1920s Broadway demolished.
Former Post Office, 1910, Broadway, John Campbell, altered.
Rialto Picture Theatre 1920s Broadway, Keith Draffin architect, altered.
St Peter's College and Christian Brothers House, 1939–1944, William Henry Gummer, architect, extant.
Former Auckland Electric Power Board Building 1949 Remuera Road, Lew Piper architect. The top floor by  J.I. Van Pels, was added in 1964. extant.
Newmarket Train Station building, 1908, George Troup architect. extant but now refurbished and relocated to the platform at Parnell station.
Former Jubilee Institute for the Blind, 1907 Edward Bartley architect, Parnell Road, now Parnell Public Library.
Olympic Swimming Pool 1939, N.F Alcock borough engineer, Parnell Road. heavily altered, now covered by a cinema and car park.

See also 
Newmarket Park

References

Further reading 

The Heart of Colonial Auckland, 1865-1910. Terence Hodgson. Random Century NZ Ltd 1992.
Colonial Architecture In New Zealand. John Stacpoole.  A.H & A.W Reed 1976
Decently And In Order, The Centennial History of the Auckland City Council. G.W.A Bush. Collins 1971.
Auckland Through A Victorian Lens. William Main. Millwood Press 1977.
The Changing Face Of Mount Eden. Faye M. Angelo. Mount Eden Borough Council. 1989.
 Newmarket Borough Council Centenary 1885-1985, Kevin Male. Newmarket Borough Council 1985.
 Newmarket, Lost and Found. Dinah Holman. Newmarket Business Association. Bush Press Of New Zealand 2001.

External links 
 Newmarket Business Association
 Photographs of Newmarket held in Auckland Libraries' heritage collections.

Suburbs of Auckland
Waitematā Local Board Area